Sherman Township is a township in Crawford County, Kansas, USA.  As of the 2010 census, its population was 536.

Geography
According to the USGS, it contains two cemeteries: Farlington and Iowa.

References

 USGS Geographic Names Information System (GNIS)

External links
 City-Data.com

Townships in Crawford County, Kansas
Townships in Kansas